Edward H. C. Gill (1879 – 1923),  often known as Ted Gill was a British socialist activist.

Born in Leominster in Herefordshire, Gill's family moved to Abertillery in Wales when he was ten years old.  He left school and began working, becoming a coal miner five years later.  Despite his shyness, he came to prominence in the South Wales Miners' Federation, which sponsored him to study at Ruskin College from 1907 to 1909.   While there, he was a founder member of the Plebs' League, and thereafter frequently spoke in favour of workers' education.  He also joined the Independent Labour Party (ILP) and devoted much time to the party, arguing in favour of the nationalisation of the mines.

Like the majority of the ILP, Gill initially opposed World War I, stating that "unless strenuous efforts are made to organise anti-war feeling, we are on the eve of a holocaust too terrible for contemplation".  However, within days he changed his mind, joining the 10th South Wales Borderers.  Unexpectedly, he received a commission as a second lieutenant, and also qualified as a machine gun instructor before sailing to France at the end of 1915.  While in the trenches at Festubert, he crawled into no man's land three times, to organise a retreat of troops at the advanced posts, and then to rescue an injured soldier, for which action he was awarded the Military Cross.  He was badly wounded at Mametz Wood, whilst leading troops forward, he suffered further wounds whilst lying on the stretcher.  As a result of his injuries, he was invalided out, with the rank of captain.

After the war, Gill suffered ongoing poor health.  He devoted his time to the Labour Party, standing in Frome at the 1918 United Kingdom general election.  Although he did not win the seat, the party saw his potential as a propagandist, specifically to counter the charge that the party was unpatriotic.  For the 1922 United Kingdom general election, he worked with J. W. Kneeshaw and W. F. Toynbee, speaking across the country, with his focus being the south west of England.  He also stood again in Frome, this time taking 48.8% of the vote and a very close second place.

Gill travelled to campaign for the Labour Party in the 1923 Morpeth by-election, but the strain on his health led to his death.

References

1879 births
1923 deaths
Alumni of Ruskin College
British Army personnel of World War I
English trade unionists
Independent Labour Party politicians
Labour Party (UK) parliamentary candidates
Recipients of the Military Cross
People from Leominster
South Wales Borderers officers
South Wales Borderers soldiers
Military personnel from Herefordshire